The 1996 Carolina Panthers season was the franchise's second season in the National Football League, the second under head coach Dom Capers, and the first at Ericsson Stadium. They improved upon their 7–9 record in 1995, and made it to the playoffs for the first time in franchise history.

The Panthers would be a huge surprise as the Panthers won their last seven games of the season to finish the season with a 12–4 record. The result was that the Panthers won the NFC West, and had a first round bye in the 1996 NFL Playoffs. The Panthers would then beat the Dallas Cowboys 26–17 before falling 30–13 to the eventual Super Bowl champion Green Bay Packers in the NFC Championship.

The Panthers did not return to the playoffs until 2003, when they would make their first Super Bowl but lost 29-32 to the New England Patriots.

Offseason
Unrestricted free agents signed:
 QB Steve Beuerlein Jacksonville
 LB Duane Bickett Seattle
 CB Eric Davis San Francisco
 LB Kevin Greene Pittsburgh
 T Greg Skrepenak Oakland
 TE Wesley Walls New Orleans

Unrestricted free agents lost:
 RB Derrick Moore Detroit
 DE Shawn Price (Restricted Free Agent) Buffalo
 QB Frank Reich New York Jets
 CB Rod Smith Minnesota

NFL Draft

Personnel

Staff

Roster

Schedule

Regular season

Standings

Regular season results

Week 1: vs. Atlanta Falcons
Kerry Collins started for the Panthers and threw two touchdowns while John Kasay booted five field goals as the Falcons were crushed 29–6.

Week 2: at New Orleans Saints
Acquired from the Jacksonville Jaguars, quarterback Steve Beuerlein did not throw a single pass, instead rushing three times for a net loss of ten yards; Kerry Collins handled the quarterbacking duties, throwing for 171 yards and one pick while Jim Everett threw for 255 yards and two touchdowns.   This game, though, was a battle of field goals; following an 84-yard Winslow Oliver punt return touchdown John Kasay provided the rest of Carolina's offense with five field goals, two of them 51-yarders, for a 22–20 Panthers win.

Week 4: vs. San Francisco 49ers
The first sign that perennial NFC West champion San Francisco was in for a serious season-long fight with Carolina came as both 2–0 teams clashed at Ericsson Stadium.  Steve Beuerlein started and threw for 290 yards, two touchdowns, and one pick; a second pick was called back on a Niners holding call.  The Panthers controlled the game from the opening kick as Steve Young was sacked four times and picked off in the fourth quarter by Brett Maxie; Willie Green and Merton Hanks also spent the day jawing at each other following Green catches, ultimately finishing up in a 23–7 Carolina win.

Week 5: at Jacksonville Jaguars
Former Jaguars quarterback Steve Beuerlein was knocked out of the game after being sacked five times.  Kerry Collins managed a touchdown throw but the Jaguars sealed the 24–14 win by recovering a late onside kick.

Week 6: at Minnesota Vikings
Two Warren Moon touchdown throws were enough for the Vikings as they edged the Panthers 14–12.  Anthony Johnson ran in a four-yard touchdown and the Panthers blocked a Vikings punt out of the endzone for a safety, but could manage no closer than the 14–12 final.

Week 7: vs. St. Louis Rams
The Panthers erupted to over 30 points for the first time in their short history as they hammered the 1–4 Rams.  Anthony Johnson rushed for 126 yards and Kerry Collins threw for 196 yards and three touchdowns, while Michael Bates added a 93-yard kickoff-return score.  Tony Banks was pounded all day, fumbling to Kevin Greene for a 66-yard touchdown and then getting crushed by Panthers defenders as he unloaded a pass picked off by Chad Cota.  The Panthers rocked to a 45–17 win.

Week 8: vs. New Orleans Saints
The Panthers rolled to a 19–7 win, but the story of the game turned out to be a postgame interview with Saints coach Jim Mora, who ripped the team by saying, "We couldn't do diddley poo offensively" in a tirade that became one of the most famous soundbites in sports history.

Week 9: at Philadelphia Eagles
The Eagles Ty Detmer delivered 342 passing yards and a touchdown and also got into a brief scrum with Lamar Lathon of the Panthers after a sack. Irving Fryar led the Eagles offense with 143 receiving yards on seven catches as the Eagles won 20–9.

Week 10: at Atlanta Falcons
The winless Falcons recorded their first win of the season as they sacked Panthers quarterbacks six times and Bobby Hebert tossed a 15-yard score to J. J. Birden.  Steve Beuerlein replaced Kerry Collins late in the game and found Mark Carrier from 12-yards out in the fourth quarter; it was not enough to prevent a 20–17 Falcons win.

Week 11: vs. New York Giants
The Panthers began an eight-game winning streak by erasing a 14–7 first-quarter gap.  They intercepted New York Dave Brown three times and outscored the Giants 20–3 after the first quarter.

Week 12: at St. Louis Rams
Panthers quarterback Steve Beuerlein and Rams quarterback Tony Banks combined for just 290 passing yards.   Beuerlein got the better of the duel with a seven-yard score to Anthony Johnson in a 20–10 Panthers win.

Week 13: at Houston Oilers
Beuerlein torched the 6–6 Oilers with three touchdown throws, to Willie Green and Wesley Walls in a 31–6 Panthers win.   Chris Chandler and sophomore Steve McNair each had an interception and the Oilers also fumbled twice.

Week 14: vs. Tampa Bay Buccaneers
Kerry Collins started and needed only 83 passing yards as the Panthers hammered the Bucs 24–0.   Trent Dilfer threw two picks and Shawn King grabbed a Bucs fumble and scored.

Week 15: at San Francisco 49ers
The Panthers effectively ended San Francisco's hopes of another division title in a matchup of two of the league's best defenses.  The two defenses, however, got crushed by offense.  The Panthers raced to a 10–0 lead in the first quarter but Steve Young found Brent Jones for a 10–7 score; the second quarter was a points explosion as Kerry Collins connected with Willie Green and ex-Niner Wesley Walls while Young found rookie Terrell Owens from 46 yards out; at the half the Panthers led 27–17.  Jerry Rice's five-yard touchdown catch in the fourth was the closest the Niners came to the Panthers as Young was picked off twice and the Niners fumbled two more times; they also were hit with 14 penalties and 121 yards. Carolina thus finished a season sweep 30–24; Collins and Young combined for 620 passing yards.

Week 16: vs. Baltimore Ravens
Despite two interceptions Kerry Collins threw for 268 yards and two second half scores, erasing a 13–10 Ravens halftime lead in a 27–16 win.   Anthony Johnson's 81 rushing yards accounted for all but one of the Panthers yards on the ground.

Week 17: vs. Pittsburgh Steelers
Former Steelers coach Dom Capers and former Steelers linebacker Kevin Greene greeted Bill Cowher and his AFC Central champions for the regular-season finale.  After a Wesley Walls touchdown catch Mike Tomczak was hit in the endzone; he threw the ball before going down but it was ruled intentional grounding, for a Panthers safety.  Kordell Stewart ran in an 80-yard touchdown, but in the fourth down 18–14 the Steelers choked on a procedure penalty and then a Chad Cota interception in the endzone.  The moment of the year, though, came in the second quarter on a Panthers punt; the ball fell into the endzone and the mascot Sir Purr jumped on the ball even though it was still live; Cowher was laughing hard at the miscue and Sir Purr was listed as having one punt return for zero yards. As of recently, this marks the only time in franchise history the Panthers defeated the Steelers.

Postseason results

Postseason

NFC Divisional Playoff

The second-year Panthers held Cowboys quarterback Troy Aikman to 165 passing yards and forced three interceptions en route to their first playoff win in team history.  Cowboys receiver Michael Irvin was knocked out of the game on its second play on a hard hit by Lamar Lathon; the hit broke Irvin's collarbone.  On offense, running back Anthony Johnson was their top performer with 104 rushing yards and a 9-yard reception. Dallas scored first on kicker Chris Boniol's 22-yard field goal, but wide receiver Michael Irvin was knocked out of the game with a separated shoulder. Carolina quarterback Kerry Collins then threw two touchdown passes, a 1-yarder to tight end Wesley Walls and a 10-yarder to wide receiver Willie Green. The Cowboys countered with a 73-yard drive to score on Aikman's 2-yard touchdown pass to Daryl Johnston, but they failed on the extra point attempt and the Panthers lead was only cut to 14–9. A bad snap on a Carolina punt attempt went out of the end zone to give the Cowboys a safety. But Panthers safety Chad Cota intercepted a pass and returned it 49 yards to set up kicker John Kasay's 24-yard field goal with three seconds in the half, giving Carolina a 17–11 halftime lead. The second half was a battle of field goals with Kasey kicking 3 over Boniol's 2.  In the final minutes of the fourth penalties on Tyrone Poole kept a Cowboys drive alive, until Aikman was intercepted by Pat Terrell; the subsequent Kasay field goal ended all hopes for the Cowboys in the 26–17 Carolina win.

NFC Championship

The Packers recorded 201 rushing yards and 476 total yards of offense. Green Bay running back Dorsey Levens recorded 117 yards receiving and 88 yards rushing, including a 29-yard touchdown catch. Quarterback Brett Favre managed to overcome two early turnovers that set up 10 Carolina points, completing 19 out of 29 passes for 292 yards and 2 touchdowns. Packers running back Edgar Bennett, who recorded 99 rushing yards, scored a touchdown from 4 yards out, and kicker Chris Jacke added 3 field goals.

Early in the first quarter, Panthers linebacker Sam Mills intercepted a pass from Favre and returned it to the Packers 3-yard line, setting up Kerry Collins' 3-yard touchdown pass to fullback Howard Griffith.  Green Bay struck back with Favre's 29-yard touchdown pass to Levens, but after forcing a punt, Carolina lineman Lamar Lathon recovered a fumble from Favre on the Packers 45-yard line.  A few plays later, John Kasay's 22-yard field goal put the Panthers back in the lead, 10–7.

But after that, the Packers dominated the rest of the game.  Favre responded by leading Green Bay 71 yards in 15 plays and scoring with a 6-yard touchdown pass to Antonio Freeman.  Then on the first play after the ensuing kickoff, safety Tyrone Williams intercepted a pass from Collins on the Packers 38-yard line.  Favre's completions to Andre Rison and Freeman for gains of 23 and 25 yards moved the ball into field goal range, and Jacke's 31-yard field goal finished the drive, giving Green Bay a 17–10 halftime lead.

On the first drive of the second half, Green Bay moved the ball 73 yards in 11 plays and scored with another Jacke field goal.  The Panthers managed to respond with an 11-play, 73-yard drive of their own and score with Kasay's second field goal, which cut their deficit to 7 points.  But Green Bay stormed right back with a 74-yard touchdown drive, featuring a 66-yard reception by Levens.  On the next play, Bennett's 4-yard touchdown run gave the Packers a 27–13 lead with two minutes left in the third quarter.  In the fourth quarter, Jacke's third field goal put the game out of reach.

Awards and records
 Dom Capers, NFC Coach of the Year
 Dom Capers, Associated Press, NFL Coach of the Year

References

Carolina Panthers seasons
NFC West championship seasons
Carolina Panthers
Carolina